Cambodia officially joined the IMF on December 31, 1969. After years of internal and external strife, the Cambodian government is currently focusing its attention to rebuilding and renovating the national economy through grants and loans from multilateral sources like the International Monetary Fund. In March 1994, the International Committee for the Reconstruction of Cambodia (ICORC) developed a comprehensive plan in effort to support Washington Consensus policy prescriptions. These reforms aimed to shift the economy from a socialist state-controlled economy towards a capitalistic market-controlled one. Since then they've had a total of two arrangements addressing fiscal management. Directors approved a loan for SDR 28.0 million (about $41 million) in support of Cambodia's 1995-96 macroeconomic and structural reformations. In 1997 domestic political uncertainty following an alleged coup d’état halted IMF disbursements but resumed again in 1998 after the formation of a new government. Since the 1990s there have been no active IMF loans, but  Cambodian and IMF relations continue through Technical Assistant strategies and yearly Article IV reports.

History 
In order to gain global economic recognition from the International Monetary Fund, Cambodia was required to make fiscal structural reforms that mimic the mechanisms of a liberal-market economy. With that said, Democracy in Cambodia has little to no legitimacy in its economy. Following independence from French colonization in 1954, Cambodia has undergone four major economic and political changes. Firstly, the abdication of the constitutional monarchy in 1955 by Sihanouk established Cambodia as a Socialist state. Then Sihanouk was overthrown by the Lon Nol dictatorship who was supported by the United States. Subsequent to the Vietnam war, President Nixon secretly bombed Cambodia. This bombing invigorated the Khmer Rouge, a communist party, with anti-modernization, and anti-western ideologies. As a result, the Cambodian Civil war and Genocide began. The organization ultimately oust Lon Nol and formally established Cambodia as a self-contained communist country. Pol Pot, the Khmer Rouge leader, systemically abolished money, private property, emptied cities and killed approximately 2 million Cambodian citizens. The communist parties goal was to reinstate Cambodia's "golden age" before colonization. The time when Ancient Khmer Empire ruled South-East Asia and heavily relied on the agricultural sector. By December 1978, Cambodia was invaded by Vietnam who implemented Hun Sen, as the new leader of the People's Republic of Kampuchea, a former Khmer Rouge commander. Guerrilla warfare still ensued post-war which cause Cambodia to suffer international economic isolation. In the 1990s the United Nations convened a Paris Conference and achieved a comprehensive international settlement for the Cambodian Conflict. Currently, Cambodia once again is a constitutional monarchy in name but is ruled exclusively by the Coalition government controlled by Hun Sen.

IMF Loans

First Arrangement: 1994 
The agreements outline in the Paris Peace Agreements satisfied the conditionality agreements of "Good Governance" according to the IMF standards. The first financial arrangement was approved on May 6, 1994, of a total of 84 million in SDR. The arrangement type is under the Extended Credit Facility (EFC) aimed to assist Cambodia with poverty reduction and growth.  Although economic growth projections calculated an approximate 7 percent growth of Cambodian economy there was almost no growth in 1997. The Hun Sen Coup in 1997 increased inflation, and military spending.  In 1996 the IMF froze transactions in response to corrupt logging practices and no collection of revenues. Cambodia received only $11.7 million of the 84 million during its three-year contract.

Second Arrangement: 1999 

Loans began to resume once again on October 22, 1999 when Cambodian authorities in collaboration with International Monetary Fund and World Bank Staff prepared and implemented the "Economic and Financial Policy Framework Paper of 1999–2002.Keat Chhon, Cambodian Minister of Economy and Finance and Chea Chanto Governor of the National Bank of Cambodia believed their economic program will support reconstruction and economic growth of Cambodia by improving social conditions and macroeconomic stability. The Memorandum outlined the formulation of a new government in 1998, and framework objectives focusing on Fiscal Reform. The IMF approved the new policies and estimated an economic growth of 6 percent if the Cambodian government is committed to the policies.

IMF Technical Assistance 
IMF technical Assistance is help from world-class IMF economists who provide expertise and advice on macroeconomic policy issues, central banking, monetary and exchange rate policies, public financing, budgeting, tax policy and administration and statistics.

Revenue Mobilization Strategy 2014–18 

 Cambodia's Development vision: Become a higher-middle income country with a per capita income between US$4,000 to UCSD5,000 by 2030.
 The Vision of the Revenue Mobilization Strategy (RMS): Collect domestic revenues efficiently and effectively to meet demands for sustainable-socioeconomic development.

RMS four main reforms:

 Promotion of tax culture
 Improvement of tax and non-tax administration
 Improvement of tax and non-tax governance
 Improvement of tax paying services

Strategy success:

Cambodia's Ministry of Economy and Finance implementations of RMS has successfully completed 71 out of 86 RMS tax administration measures, and 15 remaining are in active progress. RMS has improved human resource policies and management, introduced e-payments, improved large taxpayer management, and more. Following its success and expiration in 2018, IMF Staff and Cambodian authorities move to create a new strategy plan in 2019.

Tax Administration Modernization Priorities in 2019-23  
In response to Senior Minister of the Ministry of Economy and Finance (MEF), and Dr. Aun Pornmoniroth from the Fiscal Affairs Department's request for technical assistance, IMF staff Debra Adams, Charlie jenkins, Patrick De Mets, and Stephen Wilcox formulated Cambodia's "Tax Administration Modernization Priorities in 2019-23".

General Department of Taxation Goals and Objectives:

Goals:

 Promote voluntary compliance and minimize tax burden by providing quality services
 Ensure taxpayers meet their tax responsibilities by fairly and firmly enforcing the tax law. 
 Deliver high performance by institutional strengthening.

Objectives:

 Reduce taxpayer burden by developing simple and efficient tax administration processes: Provide accurate tax information, enhance taxpayer education, achieve fair and transparent administration, foster private sector partnership.
 Identify non-compliant taxpayers and reduce tax evasion by fairly enforcing the law 
 Increase work productivity: Support modernized technology, develop skill proficiency with training, and strengthen institutional capacity development of staff.

2019 IMF Staff Article IV Mission to Cambodia 
One benefit of IMF membership is countries are entitled to technical assistance in banking, fiscal affairs and exchange matters, and one way they help is through country surveillance and Article IV consultations. During these consultations a team of IMF economics visit countries with IMF membership and assess economic and financial developments.

In September 30 through October 11, 2019, Mr. Jarkko Turunen lead an IMF team to Cambodia's capital of Phnom Penh and released a comprehensive report of staff findings to be reviewed and presented to the IMF's Executive Board for discussion and decision.

The most important aspects of the consultation states 

 "Cambodia's economic activity has been strong, and growth is expected to remain around 7 percent this year."
 "Further measures are needed to contain high credit growth and address elevated financial sector vulnerabilities, including through targeted measures in the real estate sector."
 "Uncertainties, including from trade tensions and potential suspension of preferential market access, highlight the importance of maintaining macroeconomic stability, while meeting still large development needs, and accelerating implementation of structural reforms to strengthen competitiveness and governance."

References 

International Monetary Fund relations
Economy of Cambodia